Show Me The Money (SMTM; Korean: 쇼미더머니; RR: Syomideomeoni) is a South Korean rap competition TV show that airs on Mnet. The show has grown in popularity since the first season aired in 2012 to the eleventh season in 2022, and it is credited for increasing the South Korean public's interest in hip hop.

Background 
When SMTM first aired in 2012, it was the only show on South Korean television to focus on hip hop, and the first show on Mnet about hip hop since the music channel cancelled Hip Hop the Vibe in 2004. Han Dong-chul, the chief producer of SMTM, later said of the show, "My goal was to let people know that there is more than just idol dance music in Korea."

The format of each season varies, but generally consists of contestants going head to head in a series of challenges until only one rapper remains. The show includes a mixture of rookie and experienced rappers, with the experienced rappers typically serving as "producers," a role that includes being both mentors and judges.

Season 1 (2012) 
The first season of SMTM began airing on June 22, 2012, and was hosted by Eun Ji-won of the K-pop group Sechs Kies. The season paired experienced rappers Double K, Verbal Jint, 45RPM, MC Sniper, Miryo, Hoony Hoon, Joosuc, and Garion with rookie rappers. Notable contestants included Cheetah, one of the show's few female rappers, who would later become the winner of the first season of SMTM spin-off, Unpretty Rapstar.

Rookie rapper Loco, under the mentorship of Double K, won the competition and went on to sign with hip hop label AOMG. He later appeared on season 4 as a producer.

Season 2 (2013) 
The second season of SMTM began airing on June 7, 2013, and was again hosted by Eun Ji-won. Contestants were split into two hip hop crews, "Meta Crew," led by MC Meta of the group Garion, and "D.O Crew," led by Lee Hyun Do, formerly of '90s hip hop duo Deux. The season's contestants included several rappers who would go on to become well-known artists, including LE of EXID, DinDin, Mad Clown, and Swings.

The winner of the second season was hip hop trio Soul Dive, mentored by MC Meta.

Season 3 (2014) 

The third season of SMTM saw a number of prominent Korean hip hop figures' participation. The producers split themselves loosely along the lines of larger Korean hip hop labels, leading to Tablo and Masta Wu representing "Team YG," Dok2 and The Quiett representing "Team Illionaire," Swings and San E representing "Team Brand New Music,"  and "Team YDG".

The season was won by Bobby from K-Pop boy group iKON, (and the only idol who win SMTM title until now) together with his producers Dok2 and The Quiett of Team Illionaire.

Season 4 (2015) 

Mnet's fourth season of SMTM features YG judges Jinusean and Tablo, San E and Verbal Jint from Brand New Music, AOMG judges Jay Park and Loco (first season winner came back as a producer), and judges Zico of Block B and Paloalto (Hi-Lite Records). No contestants auditioned this year with more idol rappers, most notably, Song Min-ho of Winner, and veterans such as Black Nut and P-Type. Many of the contestants from Season 3 came back as well.

The winner of this season was Basick with his producers team San E and Verbal Jint from Brand New Music.

Season 5 (2016) 

The fifth season of SMTM featured four different producer teams consisting of: AOMG judges Simon Dominic & Gray, YG Entertainment judges Kush & Zion T, judges Dok2 & The Quiett of Illionaire Records and Gill & Mad Clown. This season held open auditions in LA for the first time with guest judge Timbaland. It also saw the participation of many popular and well known artists in the Korean hip hop scene as well as notable participants of past seasons such as G2, Reddy, C Jamm, BewhY, Bizniz, Onesun, Jin Doggae, J'Kyun, Xitsuh, Snacky Chan, One, Sanchez, Dayday, Junoflo, Myundo, Super Bee and Flowsik.

This season's winner was BewhY with his producer team of Simon Dominic and Gray from AOMG.

Season 6 (2017) 

Mnet's “Show Me the Money 6” began airing on June 30, 2017, and ended on September 1, 2017. The sixth season had four producer teams, Zico & Dean, Choiza & Gaeko of Dynamic Duo, Tiger JK & Bizzy and Jay Park & Dok2. Both rappers from previous seasons and new rappers participated, including Nucksal, QWALA, Hash Swan, LTAK, NO:EL, Woo Won-jae, Hanhae, Punchnello, Penomeco, JJK, Junoflo, J'Kyun, Ja Mezz, Rhythm Power members Boi-B, Geegoin, and Hangzoo, Microdot, Young B (winner of High School Rapper), New Champ, IGNITO, Kebee, Sleepy (Untouchable), Killagramz, Born Kim, Jin Doggae, Rudals, BIGONE (former 24K member Kim Daeil), and former SMTM1 producer, Double K.

American artist and producer Swizz Beatz was a special judge for the New York auditions of the show. "Show Me the Money 6" landed in New York and Los Angeles on May 6 and May 9, respectively.

This season drew more participants than ever before. For “Show Me the Money 5”, approximately 9,000 people auditioned to have a chance to compete on the show. “Show Me the Money 6” had over 12,000 people interested in auditioning for the show—the largest applicant pool the show ever had. As a result of the huge number of applicants, the first round of auditions in Korea took place over the course of two days. First round auditions occurred April 29–30 at Samsan World Gymnasium in Incheon. This was also the first time that auditions were held in New York City. The format for the New York auditions will be the same as the first round auditions in South Korea. New York auditions took place on May 6 at Brooklyn Studios. The Los Angeles auditions were held on May 9 at LA Anderson Warehouse.

The winner for this season was Rhythm Power's Hangzoo with his producer team of Zico and Dean of FANXYCHILD.

Season 7 (2018) 

Season 7 was known as "Show Me The Money 777 (read as Triple 7)" and began airing on September 7, 2018. This season marked the seventh season of the show. The seventh season featured four producer teams, Swings & Giriboy, Deepflow & Nucksal, Code Kunst & Paloalto, and The Quiett & Changmo. Rappers from previous seasons or from Mnet's High School Rapper series and new rappers have participated.

Different from previous seasons, this season did not have the first preliminary round. Instead, the production crew watched over 13,000 audition videos and selected about 1,000 contestants. These selected contestants then were judged by the producers teams, and the qualified ones moved on to the second round, the usual One-minute rap round. This season, the difference in the round was that it was viewed by all remaining contestants. There was also a new betting system used in the show.

The winner for this season was Nafla with his producer team of Team Just Music.

Season 8 (2019) 

Season 8 began airing from July 26, 2019. Different from previous seasons, when there were four producer teams, the eighth season featured two producer crews, one consisting of Swings, Mad Clown, Kid Milli and Boycold, with the other consisting of Verbal Jint, Giriboy, BewhY and Millic. Rappers from previous seasons or from Mnet's High School Rapper series and new rappers have participated.

Similar to the previous season, the production crew watched about 16,000 audition clips and selected about 2,000 contestants to be judged by the crews in the first round. The difference in the first round in this season is that if a contestant failed the first judging from a member of one crew, he/she can choose to go for the second judging by a member of the other crew. If the contestant managed to pass the second judging, he/she can move to the second round.

The winner for this season was Punchnello with his producer crew of BGM-v Crew.

Season 9 (2020) 

Season 9 aired its first episode on October 16, 2020. The season consists of four producing teams: Dynamic Duo & Bewhy, Paloalto & Code Kunst, Zion.T & Giriboy, and Justhis & GroovyRoom. Rappers from previous seasons or from Mnet's High School Rapper series and new rappers have participated.

For this season, there are about 23,000 applicants. The season's winner will be labelled as the "Young Boss". In addition, the winner will have ₩100,000,000 in cash and the launching of a one-year project label for his/her music activities, totaling up to ₩500,000,000.

The winner for this season was Lil Boi with Team Zion.T x Giriboy as the winning producer team. With this win, Giriboy becomes the first ever three-time winning producer of the show after winning three straight seasons. (previously won in season 777 with Team Just Music, and in season 8 with BGM-v crew)

Season 10 (2021) 

The tenth season of Show Me the Money (known as Show Me the Money 10: The Original) premiered on October 1, 2021. It broadcasts every Friday at 23:00 (KST) on Mnet. The season will feature four new producer teams Yumdda & Toil, Gaeko & Code Kunst, Gray & Mino, Zion.T & Slom.

This season saw approximately 27,000 applicants. The increase in the number of contestants joining the show is mainly due to the increasing financial difficulties most rappers face due to the ongoing COVID-19 pandemic. With the lack of in-person concerts, events, and gigs happening right now, most of them now focus on online streaming and web-content platforms which does not provide as much income. With the great success of season 9, the contestants see the show as a path to success where they can be discovered and produce chart-hitting songs.

This season will also carry out a "10th Anniversary Project" that crosses broadcasting, online and Over The Top platforms under the concept of "The Original", celebrating the show's rich history of serving as a forefront of the Korean Hip-Hop scene, as well as the emergence of up and coming Korean artists who joined the show.

The winner of this season is Jo Gwang-il, with Team Gaeko x Code Kunst as the winning producer team. He will receive a prize money of ₩300,000,000 plus album production and a one-month stay in a luxury suite.

Season 11 (2022) 

The eleventh season of Show Me the Money (Show Me the Money 11: The New One) began airing from October 21, 2022. The season features four new producer teams in Lil Boi & GroovyRoom, Jay Park & Slom, The Quiett & Leellamarz, and Justhis & R. Tee. Open auditions for the season were held from July 1 to 30, 2022. Auditions were also held in Los Angeles, United States on August 13 and 14, with Jay Park and Justhis judging the contestants who auditioned for it. This was the show's first auditions in the United States after 5 years, when it was done for Season 6.

The season saw about 30,000 applicants, the highest number throughout the series.

The winner of this season is Lee Young-ji, with Jay Park x Slom as the winning producer team. She is the first female winner of the said competition.

Discography

International versions

Plagiarism controversy 
In 2017, CJ E&M, the production company behind Show Me The Money, accused the creators of the Chinese rap competition show, The Rap of China, of plagiarism. A spokesperson for CJ E&M said that even though the logo, rules, and formats of the two shows were strikingly similar, The Rap of China was not a licensed version of the original South Korean show.

References 

 
2012 South Korean television series debuts
Korean-language television shows
Mnet (TV channel) original programming
South Korean music television shows
South Korean reality television series
Talent shows
Music competitions in South Korea
Hip hop television